Albert Fitch Bellows (November 20, 1829November 24, 1883), was an American landscape painter of the Hudson River School.

Early years
Bellows was born at Milford, Massachusetts. He first studied architecture and, in 1849, became the partner of Boston architect John D. Towle as Towle & Bellows. However, Bellows quickly turned to painting. From 1850 to 1856 he taught at the New England School of Design in Boston. He resigned his post to travel and study abroad, and spent time in Paris and at the Royal Academy at Antwerp as well as in England. He exhibited his first work at the National Academy of Design in 1857, becoming a full member in 1861.

Return to New York
Bellows settled in New York City in 1858 on his return to America. He spent most of his remaining career in New York, though he briefly moved to Boston. In 1859, he was elected into the National Academy of Design as an Associate member, and became a full member in 1861. He visited Europe again in 1867. In New York he kept a studio in the same building as many of the notable Hudson River School artists of the time.

Hudson River School
His landscape work of the 1860s is fully in the late Hudson River School tradition, though Bellows depicted people more prominently in his landscapes than most other artists. He excelled at figurative scenes.

Bellows also differed from most Hudson River School artists in that he became skilled at watercolor, and authored a respected book on the subject, Water-Color Painting: Some Facts and Authorities in Relation to Its Durability. He eventually maintained two studios, one for oil paintings and one for watercolor. He was a member of the American Watercolor Society, and an honorary member of the Royal Belgian Society of Water-Colorists.

Bellows also mastered etching—along with Samuel Colman he was possibly the only other Hudson River School artist to do so—and became a member of the New York Etching Club, the Philadelphia Society of Etchers and the Royal Society of Painter-Etchers and Engravers in London, England, an esteemed professional organization whose members included James Abbott McNeill Whistler and Francis Seymour Haden.

Bellows taught at the Cooper Union, where among his pupils was Virginia Granbery.

Death
He died in Auburndale, Massachusetts, on the 24th of November 1883. A major Albert Fitch Bellows landscape, The River Bank, is in the collection of the Columbia Museum of Art in Columbia, South Carolina.

Notes

References

1829 births
1883 deaths
19th-century American painters
American male painters
Royal Academy of Fine Arts (Antwerp) alumni
National Academy of Design members
People from Milford, Massachusetts
Painters from Massachusetts
American watercolorists
Hudson River School painters
19th-century American male artists